The Kleinberger Madonna is a painting in tempera on panel by Bramantino, dating to before 1508, in the Metropolitan Museum of Art, New York.

The work's history is unknown before the early 20th century, when it was recorded in Count Victor Goloubew's collection in Paris and misattributed to Francesco Francia. In 1912 Goloubew sold it to the art dealer Kleinberger, who later that year sold it to its present owner.

References

Paintings by Bramantino
Paintings in the collection of the Metropolitan Museum of Art
Paintings of the Madonna and Child
1508 paintings